William Lionel Eves (1867–1950), was a British architect, and the designer of the Grade II listed building Randalls of Uxbridge.

He was born in Uxbridge, the son of fellow architect George Eves (1816–1892), and succeeded him as the surveyor for the Allen Estate in Kensington, London.

Eves' architectural practice was based at 54 High Street, Uxbridge, and he designed Ilchester Mansions, Earls Court, and remodelled the frontage of the Allen Estate's properties on Kensington High Street between 1894 and 1935. He designed numerous buildings in the Uxbridge area.

In the 1939 New Year Honours, William Lionel Eves, Architect to the Uxbridge Urban District Council was made a Member of the Order of the British Empire (MBE).

References

1867 births
1950 deaths
Architects from London
Members of the Order of the British Empire
People from Uxbridge
Fellows of the Royal Institute of British Architects